Laura Wilson may refer to:
 Laura Wilson (actress) (born 1983), New Zealand actress
 Laura Wilson (photographer) (born 1939), American photographer
 Laura Wilson (writer) (born 1964), London based crime novel writer
 Laura Wilson (cross-country skier)
 Laura May Tilden Wilson, Nevada's first female lawyer

Fictional characters
 Laura Wilson, supporting character from the 2009 disaster film 2012
 Laura Wilson, protagonist of the 2014–9 comic book series The Wicked + The Divine

See also
 Laura Annie Willson, English engineer and suffragette